Bam's World Domination is a half-hour television show on Spike TV that starred Bam Margera, Ryan Dunn and fellow skateboarder Tim O'Connor. The special premiered on October 13, 2010 and is a follow-up to the shows Viva La Bam and Bam's Unholy Union. According to the show's producer Joe DeVito's Twitter account, it was a one time special and no new episodes will be aired.

This first show premiered Wednesday, October 13, 2010 at 11:30 pm, ET/PT and showcased Margera, Dunn and O'Connor doing The Tough Guy Challenge in the Perton, Staffordshire, near Wolverhampton, England.

References

External links

2010 American television series debuts
CKY
Jackass (TV series)
English-language television shows
Spike (TV network) original programming